"The Hollow" is a single from A Perfect Circle's 2000 album Mer de Noms. It serves as the opening track of the album, utilizing layered guitars. "The Hollow" was recorded in the key of B-flat minor and is arranged using a 6/8 time signature. Tim Alexander, drummer from the band Primus plays drums on the album version of the song. The song was remixed for the 2001 single release.

Track listings

Hollow, Pt. 1

"The Hollow" - 2:58
"The Hollow" (Live) - 3:04
"Judith" (Renholdër Mix)- 4:27

Hollow, Pt. 2

"The Hollow" (Live)"
"The Hollow" (The Bunk Remix)
"Judith" [Video]

The Hollow [2001 Promo CD Single]

"The Hollow" (Mix 2001) - 3:20
"The Hollow" (Album Version) - 2:58
"Call Out Hook #1"
"Call Out Hook #2"

The Hollow [Australian Release]

"The Hollow"
"The Hollow" (Live)
"Judith" (Renholdër Mix)

The Hollow [European Release]

"The Hollow"
"The Hollow" (Constantly Consuming Remix)
"The Hollow" (The Bunk Remix)
"Judith" (Renholdër Mix)
"Judith" (Video)

The Hollow (Acoustic Live From Philly)

"The Hollow (Acoustic Live From Philly)" - 4:54

Charts

References

2000 singles
A Perfect Circle songs
Songs written by Billy Howerdel
Songs written by Maynard James Keenan
2000 songs